The 100 Greatest Slovak Albums of All Time is a list of the best album releases issued by Slovak recording artists. As the first such list presented in Slovakia, it was published by Nový čas daily on 22 September 2007.

The list is entirely composed of Slovak, or else of formerly Czechoslovak artists, featuring all albums published in the country of origin from the 1960s onwards. Some of nominated full-length records could have been performed also in a different language (occasionally in English but partially). Ranking itself was based on votes received from twenty-five selected native-born musicians, critics and/or industry figures. Each of them voted ten most significant Slovak LPs from the past four decades in the country.

While the winning album became Zvoňte, zvonky (1969) by Prúdy band, the most-represented musical act on the list is female vocalist Marika Gombitová, having six out of her nine studio albums in total present. The final list also included two original motion picture soundtracks by various artists such as Neberte nám princeznú (1980) at number No. 27 and Fontána pre Zuzanu (1986) ranked at No. 90, as well as one live recording Live (1973) by Collegium Musicum at number No. 89.

Members of the Jury

Statistics

Artists with the most albums
 11 Marika Gombitová – with 6 solo albums including 1 double release, 2 with Modus, 1 soundtrack, and 2 with Miro Žbirka (as featured artist)
 9 Pavol Hammel – with 1 solo, 3 with Prúdy, 2 with Marián Varga, 2 double sets with Collegium Musicum, and 1 with Marika Gombitová (as writer)
 7 Janko Lehotský – with 3 by Modus, 3 with Marika Gombitová (as writer/featured artist), and 1 with Collegium Musicum (as featured artist)
 6 Marián Varga – with 1 solo, 3 (including two double sets) with Collegium Musicum, 1 with Pavol Hammel, and 1 with Prúdy
 6 Richard Müller – with 4 solo, and 2 with Banket 
 6 Miro Žbirka – with 3 solo, 2 with Modus, and 1 soundtrack (as featured artist)
 6 Jaro Filip – with 2 solo, 1 with Milan Lasica & Július Satinský, and 3 with Richard Müller (as writer)
 5 Dežo Ursiny – with 2 solo, 2 with Ivan Štrpka, and 1 compilation (as writer)

Number of albums from each decade
 1960s – only 1 album (1.0%)
 1970s – 13 albums (13.0%)
 1980s – 35 albums (35.0%)
 1990s – 27 albums (27.0%)
 2000s – 24 albums (24.0%)

Top 10

Top 10 – Overall

Top 10 – Females

Top 10 – Males

See also
 Slovak popular music
 Slovakia in the Eurovision Song Contest
 ZAI Awards
 U.S. 500 Greatest Albums of All Time list by Rolling Stone

References

External links
The 100 Greatest Slovak Albums of All Time by Nový čas
The 100 Greatest Slovak Albums of All Time at Topky.sk

Lists of albums
2007 in Slovakia
2007 in music